Nodicoeloceras is genus of ammonite that lived during early to middle Toarcian stage of early Jurassic. Members of this genus existed from Exaratum Subzone of Falciferum Zone to Commune subzone of Bifrons Zone. Their fossils were found in Europe, northern Africa, Asia, North America and South America. It has probably  evolved from Dactylioceras (Orthodactylites) or Kedonoceras and gave rise to Mesodactylites.

Description
Ammonites belonging to this genus have moderately evolute to cadicone shells. Whorl section is characterized by depressed whorls with convex flanks and low venter. Ribs are bifurcating at the position of ventrolateral shoulder, where tubercules, or spines are mostly present.

Synonyms
While Mesodactylites and Fibulocoeloceras are sometimes considered to be just synonyms of Nodicoeloceras, other times they are considered to be a valid genera.

References

Dactylioceratidae
Toarcian life
Early Jurassic ammonites of Europe
Ammonites of Africa
Ammonites of Asia
Ammonites of North America
Ammonites of South America
Ammonitida genera